Massachusetts Department of Higher Education (DHE) is a state agency of Massachusetts overseeing tertiary education. Its headquarters is in One Ashburton Place in Boston. Its Office of Student Financial Assistance is in Malden.

 Carlos E. Santiago is the commissioner.

It is controlled by the Massachusetts Board of Higher Education (BHE), which has thirteen members, and is itself a state agency.

See also
 Texas Higher Education Coordinating Board

References

External links
 Massachusetts Department of Higher Education
 . (Various documents related to Department of Higher Education).

Higher Education
Public education in Massachusetts